The Apple A15 Bionic is a  64-bit ARM-based system on a chip (SoC) designed by Apple Inc. It is used in the iPhone 13 and 13 Mini, iPhone 13 Pro and 13 Pro Max, iPad Mini (6th generation), iPhone SE (3rd generation), iPhone 14 and 14 Plus and Apple TV 4K (3rd generation).

Design 
The Apple A15 Bionic features an Apple-designed 64-bit six-core CPU implementing ARMv8 with two high-performance cores called Avalanche running at 3.24 GHz and four energy-efficient cores called Blizzard running at 2.01 GHz. Apple claims the A15 in the iPhones is 50% faster than the competition. Apple claims the A15 in the iPad Mini 6 is 40% faster than the A12. An in-depth breakdown by Anandtech revealed that "compared to the A14, the new A15 increases the peak single-core frequency of the two-performance core cluster by 8%, now reaching up to 3240MHz compared to the 2998MHz of the previous generation. When both performance cores are active, their operating frequency goes up by 10%, both now running at 3180MHz compared to the previous generation’s 2890MHz".

The A15 contains 15 billion transistors, a 27.1% increase from the A14's transistor count of 11.8 billion. It includes dedicated neural network hardware that Apple calls a new 16-core Neural Engine. The Neural Engine can perform 15.8 trillion operations per second, faster than A14's 11 trillion operations per second (+ 43%). The A15 also includes a new image processor (ISP) with improved computational photography capabilities. Apple also boosted performance by doubling the system cache to 32MB.

The A15 has video codec encoding support for HEVC and H.264. It has decoding support for HEVC, H.264, MPEG‑4 Part 2, and Motion JPEG.

A15 is manufactured by TSMC, reportedly on their second-generation 5 nm fabrication process, N5P.

GPU
The A15 integrates an Apple-designed five-core GPU for the iPad mini (6th generation), iPhone 13 Pro and 13 Pro Max, iPhone 14 and 14 Plus and Apple TV 4K (3rd generation). One GPU core is disabled in the iPhone SE (3rd generation), and iPhone 13 and 13 Mini, resulting in a four-core GPU for these models.

Products that include the Apple A15 Bionic 
 iPhone 14 & 14 Plus – 5-core GPU
 iPhone 13 & 13 Mini – 4-core GPU
 iPhone 13 Pro & 13 Pro Max – 5-core GPU
 iPhone SE (3rd generation) – 4-core GPU
 iPad mini (6th generation) – 5-core GPU; CPU underclocked to 2.92 GHz from 3.23 GHz
 Apple TV 4K (3rd generation) – 5-core GPU and 5-core CPU (Binned A15 with 1 efficiency CPU core disabled)

See also 
 Apple silicon, range of ARM-based processors designed by Apple for their products
 Comparison of Armv8-A processors

References

Computer-related introductions in 2021
Apple silicon